Vachellia aroma var. aroma is a large shrub or small tree which grows up to 6 m high.  It is found in southern South America.

References

aroma var. aroma
Shrubs
Trees of South America